The 6 Hours of Spa-Francorchamps (formerly the 1000 Kilometres of Spa-Francorchamps) is an endurance race for sports cars held at Circuit de Spa-Francorchamps in Belgium.

History 
The Spa 24 Hours had been introduced in 1924, and other races followed. As on the Nürburgring, both a 24-hour race for touring cars and GTs is held, and an endurance race for sports cars and GTs. The 24 hour race counted towards the inaugural World Sports Car championship in 1953, the last time that race would be held until 1964, and the last time it was for sports cars for several decades. Earlier in 1953 a minor sports car race, the Coupe de Spa was the first race held in the lineage of the 1000 km (now 6 hour) race. The first Spa Grand Prix was held in 1954, and in 1963 joined the World Sportscar Championship and was extended to 500 km. Starting in 1966 the name Spa Grand Prix was no-longer used, and the race was run for 1000 km, following the 1000 km Nürburgring and 1000 km Monza. Due to safety problems on the traditional long and very fast 14 km track over public roads, the race was discontinued after 1975.

The 1000 km race was resumed in 1982 after the track was made safer by shortening it to 7 km. In 1989 and 1990, the race distance was lowered to 480 km. Due to the decline of the WSC, the "1000km" was discontinued after 1990 even before the WSC closed.

The race was revived in 1999, as a part of the SportsRacing World Cup (the predecessor to the FIA Sportscar Championship), running to a 2-hour, 30 minute time limit.  In 2003, the 1000 km race was resumed as a joint event of the FIA SCC with the British GT Championship. In 2004, it was part of the Le Mans Series (LMS), and in 2011 was also part of the Intercontinental Le Mans Cup. From 2012 onwards the race has been part of the FIA World Endurance Championship, albeit in the format of a six-hour race.

Jacky Ickx currently holds record of most wins, having won the race 5 times, in 1967, 1968, 1974, 1982, and 1983. He is also one of two drivers to win the 1000 km on both the original and current circuits, the other being Derek Bell.

Winners

 The 1975 event was originally scheduled for 1000 km, but was shortened to 750 km the day of the race due to an approaching storm.
 The 1985 event was originally scheduled for 1000 km, but was shortened to five hours (848 km) after the ensuing 40-minute caution caused by the collision of the Bellof/Boutsen Brun Motorsport Porsche 956 with the Ickx/Jochen Mass Rothmans Porsche 962 at Eau Rouge.  Bellof died in the hospital afterwards, and officials ended the race at the five-hour mark, after 122 of 145 laps.
 The 2002 event was stopped early due to heavy rain.
 The 2010 event was red flagged during the race due to electrical outages. The race covered approximately 975 km when it on a six hour time limit.
 The 2019 event was stopped early because of snow.
 Race record for distance covered.

Records

Wins by constructor

Wins by engine manufacturer

Drivers with multiple wins

References

External links 

 Le Mans Series - 1000 km of Spa
 1,000 KM of Spa Francorchamps (ILMC/ACO)
 Racing Sports Cars: Spa archive

 
Auto races in Belgium
Circuit de Spa-Francorchamps